Woodruff is a surname. Notable people with the surname include:

 Abraham O. Woodruff (1872–1904), member of the Quorum of the Twelve Apostles of The Church of Jesus Christ of Latter-day Saints, and son of Wilford Woodruff
 Blake Woodruff (born 1995), actor
 Bille Woodruff, video and film director
 Bob Woodruff, an American journalist
 Bob Woodruff (American football) former University of Florida and Baylor University head football coach
 Bob Woodruff (singer), American country musician
 Bobby Woodruff (born 1940), former professional footballer
 Brandon Woodruff, American baseball pitcher
 Carle Augustus Woodruff (1841–1913), U.S. Army brigadier general and Medal of Honor recipient
 C. E. Woodruff, American reverend, educator, and college football coach
 Chris Woodruff (born 1973), American tennis player
 Christian B. Woodruff (born 1829), New york politician
 D. P. Woodruff, British physicist
 Dwayne Woodruff (born 1957), American football player
 Elvira Woodruff (born 1951), American children's writer
 Ernest Woodruff (1863–1944), Atlanta businessman who took over Coca-Cola
 Freddie Woodruff, American officer
 George Cecil Woodruff, an American businessman and football coach
 George Washington Woodruff, an American football coach as well as a teacher, lawyer and politician
 Hale Woodruff (1900–1980), American painter
 Hubert W. Woodruff (1923–2019), American politician
 John Woodruff (disambiguation), several people
 JT Woodruff, guitarist and lead vocalist of Hawthorne Heights
 Judy Woodruff, a TV journalist
 Lewis Bartholomew Woodruff (1809–1875), New York judge
 Maurice Woodruff (1916–1973), a British clairvoyant and astrologer
 Michael Woodruff, a pioneer in transplantation biology and surgery
 Paul Woodruff, philosophy and classics professor, University of Texas at Austin
 Richard Woodruff (Upper Canada politician) (1784–1872)
 Robert Woodruff (disambiguation), several people
 Rosalie Woodruff, Australian politician
 Roscoe B. Woodruff (1891–1975), American general
 Roy O. Woodruff (1876–1953), U.S. Representative from Michigan
 Sarah Woodruff, the main character of The French Lieutenant's Woman
 Teresa Woodruff, American reproductive scientist
 Thomas Woodruff (born 1957), American artist
 Thomas M. Woodruff (1804–1855), U.S. Congressman from New York
 Theodore Tuttle Woodruff (1811–1892), American inventor of the sleeping car for railroads. Founder of Woodruff Sleeping & Palace Car Company, Central Transportation Company, Woodruff Sleeping & Parlor Coach Company and Union Palace Car Company 
 Timothy L. Woodruff (1858–1913), Lieutenant Governor of New York
 William Woodruff (disambiguation), several people
 Wilford Woodruff, fourth President of The Church of Jesus Christ of Latter-day Saints

English toponymic surnames
Surnames of English origin